Johan Oremo (born 24 October 1986) is a Swedish footballer who plays as a forward for Ängelholms FF. He has won two caps for the Sweden national team.

Club career
Oremo started his career at Söderhamns FF in the Swedish football Division 3 before moving to Gefle IF in 2007. During his first season in Gefle he scored 11 goals in Allsvenskan. After the season, Oremo was connected with other Swedish clubs but he decided to stay in Gefle. On 3 July 2008 Oremo signed a 4 and a half year contract with Djurgårdens IF. He went on to score 3 league goals for Djurgården during the second half of the 2008 season.

Despite receiving a substantial amount of playing time, Oremo failed to score even once during the season of 2009. In September 2009, he sustained a foot injury. In February 2012, he re-signed with Gefle. He has since made 59 appearances and scored 11 goals.

International career
Oremo's début for the Swedish national team against Costa Rica on 13 January 2008. He went in for Rade Prica in the 68th minute.

Career statistics

Honours

Individual 
 Swedish Newcomer of the Year (1): 2007

References

External links
 
 

1986 births
Living people
Swedish footballers
Swedish expatriate footballers
Sweden under-21 international footballers
Sweden international footballers
Gefle IF players
Halmstads BK players
Djurgårdens IF Fotboll players
Wigry Suwałki players
Allsvenskan players
Superettan players
Division 3 (Swedish football) players
I liga players
Association football forwards
Swedish expatriate sportspeople in Poland
Expatriate footballers in Poland